The Russian Women's Handball Cup or in russian (Кубок России по гандболу среди женщин) is the second most important women's handball competition for clubs in russia after the Russian Women's Handball Super League it was introduced first in the 2005/2006 season.

Winners list

Titles by Club

References

External links
 https://rushandball.ru/competitions

Handball competitions in Russia
Handball in Russia